Sarfarazganj is a proposed Lucknow Metro station in Lucknow. It is a small locality on the Hardoi Road in the outskirts of Lucknow. In recent years, it has many residential and commercial complexes coming up here. One of the major landmarks here is the Era Medical college and hospital.

Route plan/map

References

Lucknow Metro stations